Nord 360 to 399, renumbered to Nord 4.361 to 4.400 in 1872, were 0-8-4T Engerth locomotives for freight traffic of the Chemins de Fer du Nord.
The machines were built in 1856–1857 and retired from service in 1907–1910.

Construction history
The machines were built by Schneider and Grafenstaden in 1856–1857.
The 0-8-4T locomotives were of a modified Engerth design, with the articulated two-axle tender being supported by the fourth driving axle. 
The firebox was as of the Crampton type. The boiler consisted of three boiler shells with a Crampton regulator located at the extreme front.
The cylinders were on the outside of the locomotive frame and the locomotives had a Gooch valve gear.

The machines were used for heavy coal trains and freight service.

References

Bibliography

External links
 ETH-Bibliothek Zürich, Bildarchiv. Nord 4.369, viewer

Steam locomotives of France
360
0-8-4T locomotives
Railway locomotives introduced in 1855
Schneider locomotives
Engerth locomotives
Freight locomotives